Bayt Nuba was a Palestinian Arab village, located halfway between Jerusalem and al-Ramla. Historically identified with the biblical city of Nob mentioned in the Book of Samuel, that association has been eschewed in modern times. The village is mentioned in extrabiblical sources including the writings of 5th-century Roman geographers, 12th-century Crusaders and a Jewish traveller, a 13th-century Syrian geographer, a 15th-century Arab historian, and Western travellers in the 19th century. Depopulated by Israeli forces during the 1967 war, it was subsequently leveled by military engineers using controlled explosions, and the Israeli settlement of Mevo Horon was established on its lands in 1970.

History
In Eusebius of Caesarea's 5th century Onomasticon, the village is mentioned under the name Beth Annabam and is situated at a distance of 8 Roman miles from Lydda. His contemporary, Jerome, identifies it as biblical Nob.

During the Crusades, it was called Betynoble. The Crusaders identified Beit Nuba with biblical Nob, as did the 12th-century Jewish traveller Benjamin of Tudela. The village served as the forward position for Saladin's troops for their move towards Jerusalem in September 1187 and later for Richard the Lionheart and his troops who camped there in 1191 and 1192.

Writing in the 13th century during the time of Mamluk rule over Palestine, Yaqut al-Hamawi, the Syrian geographer, noted of Bayt Nuba, that it was, "A small town in the neighbourhood of Filastin (Ar Ramlah)." A road from Ramla to Jerusalem that passed through Bayt Nuba, al-Qubeiba, and Nabi Samwil was the preferred route for Christian pilgrims to the Holy Land at the time. On the maps produced by the Palestine Exploration Fund, the road, which stretches from al-Qubeiba to Jerusalem, is marked in the legend as a Roman road.

Mujir al-Din al-'Ulaymi (1496), the Jerusalemite qadi and Arab historian, discussed the village's name in the context of other villages beginning with the word Bayt ("House"). He noted that conventional wisdom among the locals of his time held that they are named for Hebrew Bible prophets that were thought to have resided there in antiquity. He also delineated the village as forming the westernmost limit of what was considered the area of Jerusalem at his time.

Ottoman era

The waqf custodian of the mosque in Bayt Nuba (and 'Allar) in 1810 was appointed by the Ottoman imperial authorities, and hailed from the Jerusalem family of notables, the Dajanis.

Edward Robinson and Eli Smith  visited Beit Nubah in 1838 and 1852, and identified it as the Nobe mentioned by Jerome and considered by some of their contemporaries to be Bethannaba. Victor Guérin  noted in 1863 the presence of a small mosque in the village named Djama Sidi Ahmed et-Tarfinù. At his time, Beit-Nouba was made up of about 400 inhabitants whose homes were constructed on a hill between two valleys. In large, modern buildings in the village could be seen traces of more ancient building materials incorporated therein and there are some ancient cisterns as well.

Socin found from an official Ottoman village list from about 1870  that  Bet Nuba  had   23 houses and a population of  97, though the population count included  men, only. Hartmann found that  Bet Nuba had 20  houses.

In 1873, Charles Simon Clermont-Ganneau discovered  the  remains of a large medieval church in the village.  In 1883, the PEF's Survey of Western Palestine described  Bayt Nuba  as a "good-sized village on flat ground".

In 1896 the population of  Bet Nuba was estimated to be about 723 persons.

British Mandate era
In the  1922 census of Palestine, conducted by the British Mandate authorities, Bayt  Nuba had a population of 839 inhabitants, all Muslims. This had increased in the 1931 census  to 944, still all Muslim, in  226 houses.

In the 1945 statistics the population of Beit Nuba and   Ajanjul was 1,240, all Muslims,  while the total land area was 11,401  dunams, according to an official land and population survey. Of this,  1,002 dunams  were allocated for plantations and irrigable land, 6,997 for cereals, while 74 dunams were classified as built-up areas.

Jordanian era

During the 1948 Arab-Israeli War, the village was garrisoned by the Arab Legion to defend the Latrun salient. Located  behind the front line, it was subject to a skirmish attack launched by Israeli forces in Operation Yoram on the night of June 8, 1948.

The 1949 armistice line fell just a few kilometers to the south and west of villages in the Latrun salient and with a dispute between Israel and Jordan over where it lay exactly, much of the area surrounding Bayt Nuba was declared no man's land, resulting in social and economic separation from the surrounding areas. Residents of Bayt Nuba and other Latrun villages were granted Jordanian citizenship following Jordan's annexation of the West Bank in 1950. Many were prompted many to leave the area to seek livelihoods in Jordan, the Persian Gulf, South America or elsewhere due to violence between villagers and Israeli troops and the loss of access to farmlands.

In 1961, the population was  1,350 persons.

1967, and aftermath
The Latrun area was captured by Israeli troops in the first few hours of the 1967 war and the next night, orders were broadcast by Israeli military jeeps to villagers in Bayt Nuba, Yalo, and Imwas to leave their homes, resulting in some 12,000 people leaving in the space of a few hours. With the war's completion, a radio announcement from the military said villagers in the West Bank who had vacated their homes should return; however, the villagers of Bayt Nuba and the others from the Latrun area were forbidden from doing so as most of the area was declared a closed military zone. Those who tried to return were stopped at checkpoints where some were shot at. The built up area of Bayt Nuba was destroyed in military engineered explosions after the war's end, an act witnessed by some of the former residents who had fled nearby hills. After the destruction, the remains of the  medieval church, first described  by Clermont-Ganneau, have not been located.

Part of the farmlands of Bayt Nuba lay outside the closed military zone and some refugees from the village rented homes in a nearby village with a population of around 7,000 (called "Bayt Hajjar" by the author) to continue farming those lands. The settlement of Mevo Horon was built on the lands of Bayt Nuba in 1970.

References

Bibliography

External links
Welcome To Bayt Nuba
Bayt Nuba, Zochrot
Survey of Western Palestine, Map 17:    IAA, Wikimedia commons

Disestablishments in the West Bank Governorate
Arab villages depopulated after the 1948 Arab–Israeli War